Abdullah Hassan al-Asiri (1986 – 27 August 2009) was a Saudi Arabian member of al-Qaeda in the Arabian Peninsula. His name is an ascription to the 'Asir Province of Saudi Arabia.  He died in August 2009 while attempting to assassinate Saudi Arabia's Deputy Minister of the Interior, Muhammad bin Nayef, in a suicide bombing using an anally-inserted body cavity bomb.

Overview
According to the Saudi Gazette al-Asiri was recruited into al-Qaeda by his older brother Ibrahim al-Asiri, and the two brothers reportedly visited Yemen in 2007.

He rose to notability when he was named on a Saudi list of most wanted terrorist suspects on 3 February 2009, and then on 27 August 2009, for attempting to assassinate Saudi deputy minister of Interior, Muhammad bin Nayef, whom he only slightly injured in a suicide bombing.

Al-Asiri spoke to Mohammed bin Nayef a few days prior to the bombing and expressed his desire to surrender to the authorities as part of the country's terrorist rehabilitation program, and they agreed to meet.

On 27 August 2009, Asiri queued up at Mohammed bin Nayef's Jeddah palace as a "well-wisher," a tradition in the kingdom during Ramadan. He exploded a body cavity bomb (perhaps with a mobile phone), killing himself, but only lightly injuring bin Nayef (who was protected from the full force of the blast by Asiri's body).
Assisted by his older brother, Ibrahim al-Asiri, he had hidden a pound (about 0.45kg) of PETN plastic explosives in his rectum and anal canal, which security experts described as a novel technique. Asiri had passed through a metal detector and remained in the security of the Prince's bodyguards for over 24 hours before gaining the audience. "I did not want him to be searched, but he surprised me by blowing himself up," said Mohammed bin Nayef.

According to Al Arabiya, this was the first assassination attempt against a royal family member since 2003, when Saudi Arabia faced a sharp increase in al-Qaeda linked attacks. The Saudi Gazette reported on October 22, 2009, that a Yemeni named Rayed Abdullah Salem Al Harbi assisted Asiri in preparing for his suicide mission.

See also
Mohammed Abdel Karim Al Ghezali

References

External links
Al Qaida's Network in the Arabian Peninsula (Yemen), The English Translation of Sada Al-Malahim's Audio Release 'The Descendants of Muhammad bin Maslamah," Released September 21, 2009, The NEFA Foundation, accessed January 4, 2010

Al-Qaeda bombers
Saudi Arabian al-Qaeda members
Suicide bombers
2009 deaths
1986 births
Deaths by explosive device
Named on Saudi Arabia's list of most wanted suspected terrorists